The 110s decade ran from January 1, 110, to December 31, 119.

Significant people 
 Trajan, Roman Emperor

References